Uresti is a surname. Notable people with the surname include:

Carlos Uresti (born 1963), American attorney and politician
Enrique Rodríguez Uresti (born 1962), Mexican politician
Félix Uresti Gómez (1887-1923), Mexican general
Omar Uresti (born 1968), American golfer
Tomas Uresti, American politician